Pierre Petit is not to be confused with (Jean) Pierre Yves-Petit (1886–1969), another French photographer who usually operated under the name Yvon.

Pierre Lanith Petit (15 August 1832 – 16 February 1909) was a French photographer. He is sometimes credited as Pierre Lamy Petit.

Work
Petit learned photography in Paris in the workshop of  André-Adolphe-Eugène Disdéri (1819–1889) (together with 76 other employees). In 1858, he opened his own workshop in Paris with Antoine René Trinquart, later to be called La Photographie des Deux Mondes. This proved to be very successful and workshops were opened in Baden-Baden and Marseille (in partnership with Emile Cazalis).

In his lifetime he made thousands of photographs. In 1908 he handed over the business to his son.

Some highlights in Petit's career:
 He was the official photographer of the International Exposition of 1867.
 He went to New York City several times to report on the construction of the Statue of Liberty.
 Petit made many photographs of the Siege of Paris (1870–71).
 In 1898, he made some attempts in underwater photography.
 He exhibited many times at the Société française de photographie (SFP).

Publications

 Galerie des hommes de jour, a series of photographs of famous French people of the day, published in 1861
 l’Episcopat français, clergé de Paris, a series of photographs of the clergy of Paris

Museums
Museums that hold large collections of his photographs:
  in Chalon-sur-Saône
 Musée d'Orsay in Paris
 National Library of France in Paris
 National Portrait Gallery, London

Photographs

Portraits

Others

References

External links

 The Musée Nicéphore-Niépce website
 Pierre Petit on the Luminous Lint website
 Pierre Petit on the Getty Research Institute website
 Pierre Petit on the J. Paul Getty Museum website

Websites showing photographs by Pierre Petit
 Gallica, the BNF website
 The Past to Present website
 Pierre Petit on Flickr (from The Library of Nineteenth-Century Photography)

Underwater photographers
1832 births
1909 deaths
19th-century French photographers